Donald Edgar "Duck" Williams (born August 2, 1956) is an American former professional basketball player. He played in the National Basketball Association for the Utah Jazz during the 1979–80 season.

References

External links
College statistics @ sports-reference.com

1956 births
Living people
American men's basketball players
Basketball players from Alabama
Basketball players from Washington, D.C.
New Orleans Jazz draft picks
New Orleans Jazz players
Notre Dame Fighting Irish men's basketball players
People from Demopolis, Alabama
Point guards